Bob Constable (born 14 April 1932) is a former Australian rules footballer who played with Melbourne in the Victorian Football League (VFL).

Notes

External links 

1932 births
Australian rules footballers from Victoria (Australia)
Melbourne Football Club players
Murtoa Football Club players
Living people